Sajid Ahmad Khan Bhatti is a Pakistani politician who had been a member of the Provincial Assembly of the Punjab from August 2018 till January 2023.

Political career

He was elected to the Provincial Assembly of Punjab as an independent candidate from PP-67 (Mandi Bahauddin-III) in the 2018 Punjab provincial election.

Following his successful election, he joined Pakistan Muslim League (Q) (PML(Q)).

On 21 February 2023, after the dissolution of the Provincial Assembly, Bhatti, along with former Chief Minister Chaudhry Pervaiz Elahi and eight other former PML(Q) MPAs, joined the Pakistan Tehreek-e-Insaf (PTI).

He is running to be elected to the Provincial Assembly of Punjab as a PTI candidate from PP-67 (Mandi Bahauddin-III) in the 2023 Punjab provincial election.

References

Living people
Punjab MPAs 2018–2023
Pakistan Muslim League (Q) MPAs (Punjab)
Year of birth missing (living people)